The Lamb Lies Down on Broadway Tour was a North American and European concert tour by English rock band Genesis. It began on 20 November 1974 in Chicago, ended on 22 May 1975 in Besançon, France, and promoted their 1974 album of the same name. At each show, the album was played in its entirety, with one or two older songs as encores. The group's final tour with singer Peter Gabriel, it was marked by extensive theatricality, with multiple costumes worn by Gabriel, three backdrop screens that displayed 1,450 slides from eight projectors, laser lighting, and practical effects.

Overview 

Genesis supported the album with a tour across North America and Europe, playing the album in its entirety with one or two older songs as encores. Such a format was not supported by the entire band considering most of the audience were not yet familiar with the large amount of new material. The tour was scheduled to begin on 29 October 1974 with an 11-date tour of the UK that sold out within four hours of going on sale, but they were rescheduled for 1975 after guitarist Steve Hackett had crushed a wine glass in his left hand which severed a tendon and needed time to recover. The group lost money as they were unable to recoup deposits they had paid the venues. The tour began on 20 November in Chicago, and ended on 22 May 1975 in Besançon, France. The last two scheduled concerts on 24 and 27 May in Toulouse and Paris, respectively, were cancelled due to low ticket sales. Gabriel marked the occasion of his final show with the group by playing the "Last Post" on his oboe. Hackett estimated the band's debts at £220,000 at the tour's end.

The tour featured at the time some of the biggest instruments used by the band, including Rutherford's double-neck Rickenbacker guitar / Microfrets six-stringed bass and the largest drum kit ever used by Collins. The tour's stage show involved three backdrop screens that displayed 1,450 slides, designed by artist Jeffrey Shaw, from eight projectors and a laser lighting display. Banks claims that the slides came close to working perfectly on only four or five occasions. The tour was the high point of Gabriel's use of theatrics and costumes. He changed his appearance with a short haircut and styled facial hair and dressed as Rael in a leather jacket, T-shirt and jeans. During "The Lamia", he surrounded himself with a spinning cone-like structure decorated with images of snakes. In the last verse, the cone would collapse to reveal Gabriel wearing a body suit that glowed from lights placed under the stage. "The Colony of Slippermen" featured Gabriel as one of the Slippermen, covered in lumps with inflatable genitalia that emerged onto the stage by crawling out of a penis-shaped tube. Gabriel recalled the difficulty in placing his microphone near his mouth while in the costume. "Phil Collins hated the Slipperman outfit," Gabriel admitted to Mark Blake. "In fact, the whole band did, especially the fact that it had these huge inflatable testicles… But I was acting out a character and the audience were getting off on it. I was the interpreter between the band and the audience. Actually, Phil always appreciated that, but I don't think the others always did." Collins admitted at times the tour was ostentatious and "inspiration for Spinal Tap." For "it.", an explosion set off twin strobe lights that reveal Gabriel and a dummy figure dressed identically on each side of the stage, leaving the audience clueless as to which was real. The performance ended with Gabriel vanishing from the stage in a flash of light and a puff of smoke. During the final concert of the tour, roadie Geoff Banks acted as the dummy on stage, wearing nothing but a leather jacket.

In one concert review, the theatrics for "The Musical Box", the show's finale and once the band's stage highlight, was seen as "crude and elementary" compared to the "sublime grandeur" of The Lamb... set. Music critics often focused their reviews on Gabriel's theatrics and took the band's musical performance as secondary which irritated the rest of the band. Collins later said, "People would steam straight past Tony, Mike, Steve and I, go straight up to Peter and say, "You're fantastic, we really enjoyed the show." It was becoming a one-man show to the audience." The Rock and Roll Hall of Fame called the tour "a spectacle on par with anything attempted in the world of rock to that point".

Gabriel's departure 
During their stop in Cleveland in November 1974, Gabriel told the band he would leave at the conclusion of the tour. The decision was kept a secret from outsiders and media all through the tour, and Gabriel promised the band to stay silent about it for a while after its end in June 1975, to give them some time to prepare for a future without him. By August, the news had leaked to the media anyway, and Gabriel wrote a personal statement to the English music press titled "Out, Angels Out" to explain his reasons and his view of his career up to this point; the piece was printed in several of the major rock music magazines. In his open letter, he explained his disillusion with the music industry and his wish to spend extended time with his family. Banks later stated, "Pete was also getting too big for the group. He was being portrayed as if he was 'the man' and it really wasn't like that. It was a very difficult thing to accommodate. So it was actually a bit of a relief."

Recordings 
No complete performance of the album has been officially released apart from the majority of the band's performance from 24 January 1975 at the Shrine Auditorium in Los Angeles that was released as part of the Genesis Archive 1967–75 box set. Some tracks feature re-recorded vocals from Gabriel and guitar parts from Hackett and a remixed studio version of "it.", also with re-recorded vocals. The album's 2007 reissue features the album with a visual reconstruction of the tour's stage show using the original backdrop slides, audience bootleg footage, and photographs.

Tour band 
 Peter Gabriel – lead vocals, flute, varied instruments, "experiments with foreign sounds"
 Tony Banks –  Hammond T-102 organ, RMI 368x Electra Piano and Harpsichord, Mellotron M-400, ARP Pro Soloist synthesizer, Elka Rhapsody string synthesizer
 Steve Hackett – acoustic and electric guitars
 Mike Rutherford – bass guitar, bass pedals, 12-string guitar
 Phil Collins – drums, percussion, vibraphone, backing vocals; second lead vocal on "The Colony of Slippermen"

Set list 
An average set list for this tour is as follows:
 "Last Post" (Oboe solo) (22 May 1975 only) 
 "The Lamb Lies Down on Broadway"
 "Fly on a Windshield"
 "Broadway Melody of 1974"
 "Cuckoo Cocoon"
 "In the Cage"
 "The Grand Parade of Lifeless Packaging"
 "Back in N.Y.C."
 "Hairless Heart"
 "Counting Out Time"
 "The Carpet Crawlers"
 "The Chamber of 32 Doors"
 "Lilywhite Lilith"
 "The Waiting Room"
 "Anyway"
 "Here Comes the Supernatural Anaesthetist"
 "The Lamia"
 "Silent Sorrow in Empty Boats"
 "The Colony of Slippermen"
 "Ravine"
 "The Light Dies Down on Broadway"
 "Riding the Scree"
 "In the Rapids"
 "it"
Encore 
Any one, or occasionally two, of "The Musical Box" [67x], "Watcher of the Skies" [35x], and "The Knife" [7x]

If two songs were played during the encore, "The Musical Box" would be the song played first, with either "Watcher of the Skies" or "The Knife" played afterwards.

Tour dates

References 
Citations

Bibliography
 
 
 

Genesis (band) concert tours
1974 concert tours
1975 concert tours